James C. Devitt (October 12, 1929 – March 2, 1989) was a former American politician and businessman.

Born in La Crosse, Wisconsin, he graduated from St. John's Cathedral High School in Milwaukee, Wisconsin and went to Marquette University. He served in the United States Army Reserve and was a real estate developer.

A resident of Greenfield, he served in the Wisconsin State Assembly in 1967 as a Republican. In 1968, Devitt was elected to the Wisconsin State Senate.

In 1976, Devitt was convicted of a felony and removed from office after giving false testimony about his campaign finances.

Devitt died on March 2, 1989.

References

1929 births
1989 deaths
Politicians from La Crosse, Wisconsin
Politicians from Milwaukee
People from Greenfield, Wisconsin
Marquette University alumni
Businesspeople from Milwaukee
Republican Party members of the Wisconsin State Assembly
Republican Party Wisconsin state senators
Wisconsin politicians convicted of crimes
Military personnel from Milwaukee
20th-century American politicians
20th-century American businesspeople